The 1989 Queensland state election was held on 2 December 1989.

By-elections
 On 20 June 1987, Mick Veivers (National) was elected to succeed Doug Jennings (National), who had died on 9 April 1987, as the member for Southport.
 On 16 April 1988, Trevor Perrett (CEC) was elected to succeed former Premier Joh Bjelke-Petersen (National), who had resigned on 1 December 1987, as the member for Barambah. Perrett joined the Nationals in December 1988,
 On 20 August 1988, Judy Gamin (National) was elected to succeed Russ Hinze (National), who had resigned on 24 May 1988, as the member for South Coast.
 On 13 May 1989, Santo Santoro (Liberal) was elected to succeed Don Lane (National), who had resigned on 20 January 1989, as the member for Merthyr.
 On 31 July 1989, Lin Powell (Independent) resigned as the member for Isis. No by-election was held due to the proximity of the election.

Retiring Members

National
 Bill Glasson (Gregory)
 Peter McKechnie (Carnarvon)
 Ted Row (Hinchinbrook)
 Gordon Simpson (Cooroora)
 Martin Tenni (Barron River)

Liberal
 Norm Lee (Yeronga)
 Bill Lickiss (Moggill)

Labor
 Brian Davis (Brisbane Central)
 Bob Scott (Cook)
 David Underwood (Ipswich West)
 Les Yewdale (Rockhampton North)

Independent
 Eric Shaw (Manly) — elected as Labor

Candidates
Sitting members at the time of the election are shown in bold text.

See also
 1989 Queensland state election
 Members of the Queensland Legislative Assembly, 1986–1989
 Members of the Queensland Legislative Assembly, 1989–1992
 List of political parties in Australia

References
 

Candidates for Queensland state elections